The 1953 North Dunedin by-election was a by-election held during the 30th New Zealand Parliament in the Dunedin electorate of North Dunedin. The by-election occurred following the death of MP Robert Walls and was won by Ethel McMillan.

Background
Robert Walls, who was first elected to represent Dunedin North (the electorate's previous and subsequent name) for the Labour Party in the 1945 by-election, died on 6 November 1953. This triggered the North Dunedin by-election, which was held on 12 December 1953.

Candidates
Labour
There were six nominations for the Labour Party nomination:
Hubert Brown, a member of the Dunedin City Council who was Labour's mayoral candidate in 1950
Russell Calvert, an organiser for the Dunedin Combined Ratepayers' Association
Michael Connelly, a member of the Dunedin City Council and  former Legislative Councillor
Ethel McMillan, a member of the Dunedin City Council and Otago Hospital Board
Jack Stead, a member of the Dunedin City Council and Secretary of the Otago Labour Representation Committee

The Deputy Mayor of Dunedin and former Minister of Defence, Fred Jones, was also speculated as a candidate, but it was thought more likely he would seek nomination for the  electorate at the scheduled general election. Connelly, McMillan and Stead were seen as the frontrunners to win nomination. McMillan was chosen as the candidate.

National
Walter Phillips MacDougall was selected as the candidate for the National Party.

Previous election

Results
The following table gives the election results:

McMillan obtained 61.96% of the votes and was successful. McMillan became the first woman to represent Dunedin North and would represent the electorate until the 1975 election, when she was defeated against Richard Walls of the National Party.

See also
List of New Zealand by-elections
1922 Dunedin North by-election
1945 Dunedin North by-election

Notes

References

1953 elections in New Zealand
By-elections in New Zealand
1950s in Dunedin
Politics of Dunedin
December 1953 events in New Zealand